The 1999–2000 season was the 60th season in the existence of Albacete Balompié and the club's fourth consecutive season in the second division of Spanish football.

Competitions

Overall record

La Liga

League table

Results summary

Results by round

Matches

Source:

Copa del Rey

First round

Second round

References

Albacete Balompié seasons
Albacete